Charles D. Worthington (April 12, 1928 – December 31, 1999) was an American politician from the state of New Jersey. He served one term in the New Jersey General Assembly from the 2nd Legislative District from 1974 to 1975. He also became the first County Executive of Atlantic County in November 1975, briefly serving in both positions at the same time. Worthington won his reelection bid for County Executive in 1979.

References

1928 births
1999 deaths
Democratic Party members of the New Jersey General Assembly
Atlantic County, New Jersey executives
20th-century American politicians